Friedrich Count of Lippe-Biesterfeld (10 May 1852 Mechernich - 15 August 1892) was Count of Lippe-Biesterfeld.

Early life
Friedrich was born at Mechernich, Kingdom of Prussia, (now in North Rhine-Westphalia, Germany) the tenth child and seventh son of Julius, Count of Lippe-Biesterfeld (1812–1884), and his wife Countess Adelheid Clotilde Auguste of Castell-Castell (1818–1900),  daughter of Friedrich, Count of Castell-Castell, and his wife, Princess Emilie of Hohenlohe-Langenburg. Count Friedrich had thirteen brothers and sisters. The oldest brother Ernest II, Count of Lippe-Biesterfeld was the head of the Lippe-Biesterfeld line of the House of Lippe. From 1897 until his death he was the regent of the Principality of Lippe.

Marriage
Friedrich married on 10 October 1882 at Triefenstein am Main to Princess Maria zu Löwenstein-Wertheim-Freudenberg (1861–1941),  daughter of Prince Wilhelm of Löwenstein-Wertheim-Freudenberg (1817–1887), and his wife, Olga Gräfin von Schönburg-Glauchau, daughter of Karl Heinrich Alban Graf und Herr von Schönburg-Forderglauchau and his wife Countess Amalie Jenison von Walworth. The couple had three daughters:
Countess Adelheid Wilhelmine of Lippe-Biesterfeld (14 October 1884 – 9 March 1961), married in 1921 to Prince Heinrich von Schönburg-Waldenburg (1863–1945)
Countess Olga Agnes of Lippe-Biesterfeld (9 December 1885 – 2 March 1973), married in 1921 to Count Conrad zu Erbach-Erbach (1881–1940)
Countess Marie Elisabeth of Lippe-Biesterfeld (21 Juni 1890 – 27 November 1974), married in 1920 to Prince Carl zu Isenburg und Büdingen zu Büdingen (1875–1941)

Death
Count Friedrich lived only forty years. Did not hold any important political functions. He died in 1892. He gained the title of Graf zur Lippe-Biesterfeld.

Notes and sources
Frederik Karel Oscar Hendrik van Lippe-Biesterfeld
Friedrich Count of Lippe-Biesterfeld
Friedrich Karl Oskar Heinrich Graf zur Lippe-Biesterfeld
Gens Nostra, Reference: 1962

References

1852 births
1892 deaths
People from the Principality of Lippe
House of Lippe
Counts of Lippe-Biesterfeld